Monticello is the largest city in and the county seat of Jasper County, Georgia, United States. The city includes historic buildings such as the Jasper County Courthouse, Monticello High School and the Monticello Historic District. The population was 2,657 at the 2010 census.

History
Monticello was founded in 1808 as seat of the newly formed Jasper County. The city was named after Monticello, the estate of Thomas Jefferson. It was incorporated as a town in 1810 and as a city in 1901.

Geography
Monticello is located in the center of Jasper County at  (33.303247, -83.685766). Georgia State Routes 11, 16, 83, and 212 all meet at the center of town. SR 11 leads north  to Mansfield and south  to Gray, SR 16 leads east  to Eatonton and west the same distance to Jackson, SR 83 leads northeast  to Shady Dale and southwest  to Forsyth, and SR 212 leads northwest  to the outskirts of Atlanta and southeast  to Milledgeville.

The city is part of the Oconee River watershed.

Demographics

2020 census

As of the 2020 United States census, there were 2,541 people, 1,110 households, and 698 families residing in the city.

2000 census
As of the census of 2000, there were 2,428 people, 927 households, and 609 families residing in the city. The racial makeup of the city was 44.77% White, 53.50% African American, 0.12% Native American, 0.37% Asian, 0.70% from other races, and 0.54% from two or more races. Hispanic or Latino people of any race were 3.17% of the population.

There were 927 households, out of which 33.9% had children under the age of 18 living with them, 40.0% were married couples living together, 22.0% had a female householder with no husband present, and 34.3% were non-families. 31.1% of all households were made up of individuals, and 14.7% had someone living alone who was 65 years of age or older. The average household size was 2.56 and the average family size was 3.21.

In the city, the population was spread out, with 28.3% under the age of 18, 8.2% from 18 to 24, 26.0% from 25 to 44, 21.6% from 45 to 64, and 15.9% who were 65 years of age or older. The median age was 36 years. For every 100 females, there were 79.7 males. For every 100 females age 18 and over, there were 73.1 males.

The median income for a household in the city was $35,058, and the median income for a family was $46,705. Males had a median income of $30,565 versus $21,793 for females. The per capita income for the city was $15,743. About 16.9% of families and 21.4% of the population were below the poverty line, including 24.6% of those under age 18 and 20.2% of those age 65 or over.

Education

Jasper County School District
The Jasper County School District holds pre-school to grade twelve, and consists of two elementary schools (K-2 & 3-5 respectively), a middle school, and a high school. The district has 132 full-time teachers and over 2,181 students.
Jasper County Primary School
Washington Park Elementary School
Jasper County Middle School
Jasper County High School
Piedmont Academy - K3-12, co-ed, member of Georgia Independent School Association, established 1970

Historic school 
 Monticello High School - presently Thomas Persons Hall

Representation in media
The Bingo Long Traveling All-Stars & Motor Kings (1976) filmed many scenes in Monticello. The exteriors of buildings on the town square were remodeled to appear of the era of the movie.
Murder in Coweta County (1983), starring Andy Griffith, Johnny Cash, and June Carter Cash
 Many scenes of My Cousin Vinny (1992) were set at the courthouse and town square, and other scenes were also shot in town.

Climate
The climate is characterized by relatively high temperatures and evenly distributed precipitation throughout the year. The Köppen Climate Classification subtype for this climate is "Cfa" (Humid subtropical climate).

Geology and soils
The bedrock under Monticello is an intermediate-to-mafic type on which dark red clay with dark reddish brown loam topsoil is mapped as Lloyd series.

Notable people
William A. Connelly, sixth Sergeant Major of the Army
Elizabeth Otis Dannelly (1838–1896), poet
Rob Evan, singer, actor in many Broadway musicals, including The Dream Engine
Willis Flournoy, Negro league baseball player
Luke Gallows, professional wrestler
Susan Holmes, politician; first female mayor of Monticello
Buckshot Jones, NASCAR driver
Ulysses Norris, University of Georgia football player; seven-year NFL career with the Detroit Lions (five years) and Buffalo Bills (two years)
John Gill Shorter, 17th governor of Alabama
Sherry Smith, Major League Baseball player, pitched in two World Series
Odell Thurman, University of Georgia and NFL football player
Trisha Yearwood, country singer

References

External links
City of Monticello official website
Hebron Baptist Church historical marker
Jackson Springs historical marker
Site of Inn historical marker
 Citizens of the Year at jaspercountycoc.com via archive.org

Cities in Georgia (U.S. state)
Cities in Jasper County, Georgia
County seats in Georgia (U.S. state)